Paul Lacoste may refer to:

 Paul Lacoste (academic) (1923–2009), Canadian academic
 Paul Lacoste (Canadian football) (born 1974), former CFL player